David Andrew Wilkie  (born 8 March 1954) is a Scottish former competitive swimmer who was Olympic and Commonwealth Games champion in the 1970s.  He is the only person to have held British, American, Commonwealth, European, world and Olympic swimming titles at the same time and was the first British swimmer to win an Olympic gold medal since Anita Lonsbrough in 1960.

He is a member of the Scottish Sports Hall of Fame, the International Swimming Hall of Fame, has been described as Scotland's greatest swimmer and Britain's finest swimmer.

Early days

David Wilkie's parents came from Aberdeen, Scotland, but were stationed in Colombo, Sri Lanka, when Wilkie was born on 8 March 1954. His family regularly patronised the open air Colombo Swimming Club where Wilkie learned to swim.

At 11 years old his parents sent him back to Scotland as a boarding school pupil at Daniel Stewart's College in Edinburgh, and, while a student there, he joined the Warrender Baths Club, one of Scotland's most successful swimming clubs. It was there that he began to train intensively and develop his specialist stroke, the breaststroke under one of Britain's leading coaches Frank Thomas, whom Wilkie credited with giving him the motivation to become a world class swimmer. In 1969, Wilkie was chosen to join the elite Scottish Training Squad organised by the Scottish Amateur Swimming Association.

National and international success
In 1969 Wilkie swam representing Britain for the first time in an international swimming contest swimming against the Russian 200-metre breaststroke world record-holder Nikolai Pankin.

Wilkie broke the British record for the 200-metre breaststroke in an international match against Denmark in July 1970. He then won a bronze medal in front of his home crowd in the 1970 Commonwealth Games in Edinburgh in the 200-metre breaststroke breaking his own British record again. He wore a swim cap for that event during the commonwealth games, making him the first elite swimmer to wear one in a major competition.

In 1970 the Scottish Amateur Swimming Association awarded Wilkie the Nancy Riach Memorial Medal Award (awarded to the person who has the done the most to enhance or uphold the prestige of Scottish Swimming during the year) and the W.G. Todd Cup and Prize (Junior Swimmer of the Year). This was the first time in the Association's history that both awards had gone to the same person in the same year. Wilkie continued to hold the Nancy Riach award every year from 1972 to 1976.

At the Scottish national long course championships in 1972, Wilkie won five events. However Wilkie's world breakthrough came when he won silver in the 200-metre breaststroke at the 1972 Summer Olympics in Munich, Germany, in a European record time of 2:23:67 in spite of being ranked only 25th in the world. He also broke the Scottish record times for the 100-metre breaststroke and the 200-metre individual medley.

Starting in 1973, Wilkie was studying and swimming in the United States. He won the World Championship for 200-metre breaststroke in Belgrade, Yugoslavia, and broke the world record.

At the 1974 Commonwealth Games in Christchurch, New Zealand, he won a gold in the 200-metre breaststroke, a second gold in the 200-metre individual medley, and a silver in the 100-metre breaststroke. Also in 1974 at the European Championships in Vienna, Austria, he won a gold in the 200-metre individual medley in a world record time. He also won gold for the 200-metre breaststroke and silver as a member of the British 4x100-metre medley relay team. From 1972 to 1976 he was unbeaten in 200-metre breaststroke races.

Olympic gold

However, it was after several years of further intensive training, while studying at the University of Miami on an athletic scholarship and competing for the university's Miami Hurricanes swimming and diving team, that Wilkie's finest hour came. He won gold in the 200-metre breaststroke at the 1976 Summer Olympics in Montreal, in a world-record time of 2:15:11 and preventing an American sweep of the men's swimming gold medals. He also added a 100-metre silver medal to his collection in a time of 1:03:43 His world record was to remain unbroken for six years.

Wilkie won three Amateur Athletic Union (AAU) National US Championships and three NCAA Men's Swimming and Diving Championships (NCAA) US college championships while at Miami, was four times All-American and was inducted into the University of Miami Sports Hall of Fame in 1987. The head swimming coach there was Bill Diaz and his individual coach was Charlie Hodgson.

He was European Swimmer of the Year three times, British Sports personality of the year in 1975, in 1977 he was appointed Member of the Order of the British Empire, in 1982 he was inducted into the International Swimming Hall of Fame and in 2002 was inducted into the Scottish Sports Hall of Fame.

Post-competitive swimming

Since his retirement, Wilkie remained active in the world of swimming, involved in swimming aids and technology. He was said to be the first swimmer to wear a head-cap and goggles together in competition to improve the streamline effect within the water although he also said he wore the goggles because of an allergy to chlorine in the water and the cap to keep his long hair in.

Wilkie co-founded a healthcare company called Health Perception (UK) Ltd. in 1986.  It was sold to William Ransom and Son plc in 2004 for £7.8 million. In 1985 he met his Swedish partner Helen Isacson with whom he had two children, Natasha and Adam who were 23 and 20 in 2013. In 2009 he helped found Pet's Kitchen, a pet food company supplying British supermarkets.

In an interview with bunkered.co.uk in April 2016, Wilkie criticised the re-introduction of golf to the Olympic Games. He called Jack Nicklaus and Gary Player's claims that the Olympics would grow the game globally as 'absolute bullshit', while he also said that players who do not stay in Rio de Janeiro for the duration of the Games can not be classed as true Olympians.

See also

 List of Commonwealth Games medallists in swimming (men)
 List of Olympic medalists in swimming (men)
 World record progression 200 metres breaststroke
 World record progression 200 metres individual medley

References

Bibliography

David Wilkie by David Wilkie, Pat Besford and Tommy Long, Kemps, 1976; 
 Winning with Wilkie : A Guide to Better Swimming by David Wilkie and Athole Still, Stanley Paul, 1977 
Splash! : Swimming with Wilkie by David Wilkie and Kelvin Juba, Hutchinson, 1982; 
The Handbook of Swimming by David Wilkie and Kelvin Juba, Pelham, 1986;

External links 
 honoree profile at International Swimming Hall of Fame
 profile on Team Scotland
 

1954 births
Living people
Swimmers from Colombo
Olympic swimmers of Great Britain
Olympic gold medallists for Great Britain
Olympic silver medallists for Great Britain
Scottish Olympic medallists
Sportspeople from Edinburgh
Scottish male swimmers
Male breaststroke swimmers
Male medley swimmers
Commonwealth Games gold medallists for Scotland
Commonwealth Games silver medallists for Scotland
Commonwealth Games bronze medallists for Scotland
Swimmers at the 1970 British Commonwealth Games
Swimmers at the 1974 British Commonwealth Games
Swimmers at the 1972 Summer Olympics
Swimmers at the 1976 Summer Olympics
Members of the Order of the British Empire
World record setters in swimming
People educated at Stewart's Melville College
World Aquatics Championships medalists in swimming
European Aquatics Championships medalists in swimming
Miami Hurricanes men's swimmers
Medalists at the 1976 Summer Olympics
Medalists at the 1972 Summer Olympics
Olympic gold medalists in swimming
Olympic silver medalists in swimming
Commonwealth Games medallists in swimming
Medallists at the 1970 British Commonwealth Games
Medallists at the 1974 British Commonwealth Games